Christopher Svensson (1965 – 21 July 2018) was a British automobile designer known for innovative Ford cars of the 1990s.

Early life
He was born in Sunderland. His grandfather was Swedish. He left school to do a foundation art course at Sunderland Polytechnic. He enrolled at the Royal College of Art in 1990, and graduated with a Master of Arts degree in 1992.

Career

Ford
He joined Ford in 1992, as an exterior designer with Ford Germany (Ford-Werke GmbH). He is known for his work on the innovative Ford Ka, which was launched in September 1996. He designed it at Ford in Cologne, and the design owed much to his graduation show of 1992.

In 2008, he began work on the Ford Kinetic Design third-generation of the Ford Focus, which is the version in production since 2010, built at Saarlouis Body & Assembly in Germany.

In January 2012, he became Design Director of Asia Pacific & Africa, at Ford Australia in Campbellfield, Victoria. In January 2014, he became Design Director of The Americas, overseeing the styling of the 2015 Ford GT.

Personal life
He married Sonia Mann in December 1996 in Ampthill, then a part of the Mid Bedfordshire District. They have twin daughters together, born in November 2000. Svensson last lived in Dearborn, Michigan, and formerly lived in Cold Norton, Essex. He met his wife at the Royal College of Art, where she was studying textiles. Svensson died on 21 July 2018 of cancer at the age of 53.

See also
 J Mays

References

External links
 Ford

1965 births
2018 deaths
Alumni of the Royal College of Art
Alumni of the University of Sunderland
British automobile designers
Ford designers
People from Dearborn, Michigan
People from Maldon District
People from Sunderland
English people of Swedish descent